Jami'at al-Zahra is the world's main Shia seminary for women. It is located in Qom, Iran.

The seminary teaches female students only, both Iranian and foreign. Most students attend the college, though distance learning is also possible. 
If they are single, students may reside in the dormitories associated with Jami'at al-Zahra. Otherwise, they live at home. 

Jami'at al-Zahra was founded in 1984 to unite several women's seminaries in Qom, including Maktab-e Ali, Maktab-e Tawhid (the women's wing of the Haqqani seminary), and Dar al-Zahra (the women's wing of grand ayatollah Shariatmadari's Dar al-Tabligh), which had all opened in the 1970s.

From its inception until today, 12,000 students have enrolled in Jami'at al-Zahra. Many religious women enter Jami'at al-Zahra today, because "there is less competition to enter these [religious] schools than to enter the universities, for which students need to pass the barrier of the national concour (the national entrance exam)."

Teachers at Jami'at al-Zahra include Rahim Ra’ouf, Fariba Alasvand and Farideh Mostafavi (Khomeini's daughter). 

One of the students of  Jami'at al-Zahra used to publish a blog about her life at the seminary, as well as the life of her husband who also studied in Qom. The very popular blog was called the “Journal of the Wife of a Cleric” (“Yaddasht haye hamsar-e yek rohani”).

A sister seminary was established in Lucknow, India, within the 20th century. It is run by the family of Moulana Haidar Mahdi Zaidi (who passed in 2011), and his wife Syeda Rabab Zaidi, and is the largest seminary of female Shia students in India.

Websites 

 http://www.j-alzahra.org/

References 

Education in Iran
Qom County
Shia Islam
History of the Islamic Republic of Iran
Politics of Iran
Iranian neoconservatism